The Henry Atchley House is a historic house in Dalark, Arkansas, a rural town in western Dallas County.  It is located on County Road 249, just off Arkansas Highway 8.  The two story wood-frame house was built in 1908 by Henry Atchley, who ran a general store in town.  The house is basically vernacular in form, but has a number of stylish elements, including turned posts supporting a hip-roofed porch across the front, and a double-door entry with transom window.  The front block of the house has a side-gable roof pierced by three gabled dormers, and there is a cross-gabled ell extended to the rear.  The house was built in the economic boom associated with the arrival of the railroad and the community's subsequent economic success as a lumber town.

The house was listed on the National Register of Historic Places in 1983.

See also
National Register of Historic Places listings in Dallas County, Arkansas

References

Houses on the National Register of Historic Places in Arkansas
Colonial Revival architecture in Arkansas
Houses completed in 1908
Houses in Dallas County, Arkansas
National Register of Historic Places in Dallas County, Arkansas
1908 establishments in Arkansas